was a Japanese domain of the Edo period, located in Awa Province (modern-day Chiba Prefecture), Japan. It was centered on what is now part of the modern city of Tateyama, Chiba.

In the han system, Hōjō was a political and economic abstraction based on periodic cadastral surveys and projected agricultural yields.  In other words, the domain was defined in terms of kokudaka, not land area. This was different from the feudalism of the West.

History
Hojo Domain was created in 1638 for Yashiro Tadamasa, the former karō to the ill-fated Tokugawa Tadanaga. On Tadanaga’s disgrace and execution, Yashiro Tadamasa had been arrested and relieved of his position and titles. However, in 1638, he was rehabilitated by Shōgun Tokugawa Iemitsu and allowed a minor 10,000 koku holding in southern Bōsō Peninsula under the watchful eyes of the neighboring Tateyama Domain. 

Outraged farmers seized control of the domain, and even attempted to storm Yashiro's Edo residence, and the rebellion was suppressed by force from the Tokugawa shogunate, leading to many executions. The Yashiro were then dispossessed from their domain and reduced to hatamoto status.

On October 18, 1725, the domain was revived for Mizuno Tadasada, a hatamoto, and the younger son of a hatamoto whose holding passed the 10,000 koku qualifying mark to become a daimyō. His descendants continued to rule the small domain until 1827, when Mizuno Tadateru transferred his residence to what is now part of Ichihara in neighboring Kazusa Province, and renamed to domain "Tsurumaki Domain".

List of daimyōs
 Yashiro clan (fudai) 1638–1712

  Mizuno clan (fudai) 1712–1871

References

Further reading

External links
 Hojo on "Edo 300 HTML"

Domains of Japan
1827 disestablishments
Domains of Chiba Prefecture